Issam Hussein Naaman (born April 2, 1942) is a Lebanese lawyer, politician, author, lecturer, and former Member of Parliament and Minister of Telecommunications.

Early life and education 
Naaman was born April 2, 1942, in Sidon, Lebanon. He earned a BA in public administration in 1958, and an MA in political science in 1965, both from American University of Beirut (AUB). He received his Licence en droit (Bachelor of Law) in 1960, and an MA in public law in 1979, both from Lebanese University. In 1984, he completed a PhD in public law from Columbia Pacific University, San Rafael, California.

Career 
Naaman has been an Attorney since 1963. From 1975 to 1982, he was a member of the leadership of the Lebanese National Movement. From 1978 to 1988 he was a lecturer at the Faculty of Information, Lebanese University.

In 1992, he was elected to the Lebanese Parliament, and served until he was defeated in the 1996 elections. He served as Minister of Telecommunications in Prime Minister Salim Hoss's cabinet from 1998 to 2000. In 2005, he became a member of the "Third Force Movement".

Holocaust denial 
According to the Anti-Defamation League, Naaman wrote in newspaper Al-Quds Al-Arabi, published in London on 22 April 1998:

Publications 
Naaman is the author of several books and political articles. His main books are:

Notes

References

External links
Issam Naaman

 	

1937 births
Government ministers of Lebanon
Members of the Parliament of Lebanon
Columbia Pacific University alumni
Lebanese University alumni
American University of Beirut alumni
People from South Lebanon
People from Sidon
Holocaust deniers
Living people
Lebanese Druze